Valley FM is the on air name used by a number of radio stations:

 1VFM in Canberra, Australia
 2LVR in Parkes, Australia
 3V05 in Bright, Australia
 4BVR in Esk, Australia
 Valley FM (South Africa) in the Western Cape, South Africa
 Valley FM (Scotland) Bo'ness and Forth Valley, Central Scotland